The following lists events that happened during 1834 in Australia.

Incumbents

Governors
Governors of the Australian colonies:
Governor of New South Wales - Major-General Sir Richard Bourke
Lieutenant-Governor of Tasmania - Colonel George Arthur
Governor of Western Australia as a Crown Colony - Captain James Stirling

Events
 1 January – The Western Australian Police Force is formed.
 14 January – The ten remaining convicts at the Macquarie Harbour Penal Station hijack a brig and escape to Chile in the Frederick escape
 28 October – The Battle of Pinjarra occurs in the Swan River Colony in present-day Pinjarra, Western Australia. Between 14-40 Aborigines are killed by British colonists.
 19 November – The first permanent European settlement on the north coast of Bass Strait is established at Portland by Edward Henty.

Births
 5 January – William John Wills, explorer (born in the United Kingdom) (d. 1861)
 9 January – Roger Vaughan, archbishop (born in the United Kingdom) (d. 1883)
 14 January – Duncan Gillies, 14th Premier of Victoria (born in the United Kingdom) (d. 1903)
 25 February – Louisa Atkinson, writer, botanist and illustrator (d. 1872)
 1 April – Arthur Orton, butcher (born in the United Kingdom) (d. 1898)
 9 May – Peter Waite, pastoralist, businessman and philanthropist (born in the United Kingdom) (d. 1922)
 25 May – John Tebbutt, astronomer (d. 1916)
 30 May – Sir Frederick Sargood, Victorian politician (born in the United Kingdom) (d. 1903)
 12 June – Christopher Augustine Reynolds, archbishop (born in Ireland) (d. 1893)
 21 July – James Charles Cox, physician and conchologist (d. 1912)
 29 September – Sir William Charles Windeyer, New South Wales politician and judge (born in the United Kingdom) (d. 1897)
 12 October – Sir George Dibbs, 10th Premier of New South Wales (d. 1904)
 Unknown, possibly March – Patrick Durack, pastoralist and pioneer (born in Ireland) (d. 1898)

Deaths
 11 April – John Macarthur, New South Wales politician, pastoralist and officer (born in the United Kingdom) (b. 1767)
 7 May – Billy Blue, convict and boatman (born in the United States) (b. 1767)

Notes

 
Australia
Years of the 19th century in Australia